Calligraphidia opulenta is a moth in the family Erebidae first described by Heinrich Benno Möschler in 1887. It is known from Gabon and Ghana.

References

Moths described in 1887
Calpinae
Moths of Africa